Heather Bambrick (born January 19, 1971) is a Canadian jazz singer, voice over artist, and radio broadcaster based in Toronto, Ontario.

Early life
Heather Bambrick was born in St. John's, Newfoundland and Labrador, to parents John and Joan Bambrick. She attended Holy Heart of Mary High School and was very active in the music program there, singing with their award-winning Chamber Choir.  She went on to study Political Science and English at Memorial University of Newfoundland, graduating with a Bachelor of Arts degree.  During her university studies, Bambrick began performing part-time as a dinner theatre actress in various productions, and was singing with a number of community Jazz choirs.

Career 
In 1993, Bambrick moved to Ontario to study at the University of Toronto as a Voice major in the Jazz Studies Department. She graduated in 1997, with a Bachelor of Music degree and began working as a freelance musician and teacher.  She was a founding member of the Beehive Singers, and recorded with them on projects for Jaymz Bee and the Royal Jelly Orchestra, Carol Welsman, as well as on their own self-titled album in 1990.  The group disbanded soon after the release of their only recording, at which point Bambrick began a solo career, releasing several solo recordings, including It's About Time, Those Were The Days, (both of which were nominated for East Coast Music Awards) and You'll Never Know, the latter of which earned her a 2017 JUNO-Award nomination for Vocal Jazz Album of the Year, and a 2018 East Coast Music Award nomination for Jazz Recording of the Year.  In June, 2019, she released "Fine State", featuring more pop/rock-inspired arrangements, and making musical commentary about the world around her.  In 2004, Bambrick was named "Jazz Vocalist of the Year" at the Canadian National Jazz Awards.

In between solo projects, Bambrick was a guest vocalist on a number of other recordings, including those for The Breithaupt Brothers, the Caliban Bassoon Quartet, Irving Dobbs, and the late Peter Appleyard.  In 2012, she formed Broadsway with fellow Toronto-based artists Diane Leah and Julie Michels.  Together, they released two studio recordings:  Old Friends, and The Most Wonderful Time ... Maybe.

Beyond music, Bambrick is active as a voice actor on a number of commercial campaigns and television series, including  Get Ed, Wild Kratts, Daniel Tiger's Neighborhood, The Ron James Show, and Justin Time. Bambrick was replaced, by Sabryn Rock, as Koki on the Wid Kratts before the 7th season, receiving backlash for voicing a black character as a white woman. A spokesperson from PBS kids said, “PBS Kids and the series producers of Wild Kratts wholeheartedly believe that we must insist on diversity in children’s programs, both on screen and behind the scenes.”  She has voiced characters for various other series, including Odd Job Jack, The Dating Guy, The Cat in the Hat Knows a Lot About That, Atomic Puppet, Hotel Transylvania: The Series, The Three Amigonauts, and several others.

In 2001, Bambrick began broadcasting at JAZZ.FM91, in Toronto, where she has hosted several shows including "Sing, Sing, Sing", "Wake Up ... with Heather Bambrick", "Jazzology", and "Sunday Afternoon Jazz".  She is currently producer and host of "The Heather Bambrick Show".  Heather is also one of the founders of JAZZCAST, an internet radio station based in Toronto, ON.  She is a three-time nominee and two-time winner of "Broadcaster of the Year" at the National Jazz Awards.

References

External links 
 
 Heather Bambrick from her website

1971 births
20th-century Canadian actresses
21st-century Canadian actresses
Actresses from Newfoundland and Labrador
Canadian film actresses
Canadian radio hosts
Canadian television actresses
Canadian voice actresses
Living people
Musicians from St. John's, Newfoundland and Labrador
21st-century Canadian women singers
Canadian women radio hosts